Markham—Stouffville is a federal electoral district in Ontario, Canada. It encompasses a portion of Ontario previously included in the electoral districts of Markham—Unionville and Oak Ridges—Markham.

Markham—Stouffville was created by the 2012 federal electoral boundaries redistribution and was legally defined in the 2013 representation order. It came into effect upon the dropping of the writs for the 2015 federal election. Helena Jaczek has represented the riding since the 2019 federal election.

Geography

The territory of the riding (map) consists of part of the Regional Municipality of York: (a) the Town of Whitchurch-Stouffville; and (b) the part of the City of Markham lying easterly of a line described as follows: commencing at the intersection of the northerly limit of Markham with Highway 48; then southerly along Highway 48 to 16th Avenue; then westerly to McCowan Road; then southerly to Highway 407; then easterly along Highway 407 to the Rouge River; then generally southeasterly along Rouge River to the southerly limit of Markham. The riding's population is estimated at 109,780.

Demographics
According to the 2021 Canada Census

Ethnic groups: 36.0% White, 27.7% Chinese, 19.0% South Asian, 3.7% Black, 3.6% Filipino, 1.1% Arab, 1.1% West Asian

Languages: 51.2% English, 12.7% Cantonese, 7.1% Mandarin, 4.9% Tamil, 1.6% Italian, 1.6% Urdu, 1.4% Tagalog, 1.0% Gujarati

Religions: 47.0% Christian (22.3% Catholic, 4.3% Christian Orthodox, 2.6% Anglican, 2.2% United Church, 1.3% Baptist, 1.1% Presbyterian, 13.2% Other), 10.2% Hindu, 6.9% Muslim, 2.4% Buddhist, 1.0% Sikh, 31.5% None

Median income: $43,200 (2020)

Average income: $59,800 (2020)

Members of Parliament

This riding has elected the following Members of Parliament:

Election results

References

Ontario federal electoral districts
Politics of Markham, Ontario
Whitchurch-Stouffville
2013 establishments in Ontario